Tomiura Station (富浦駅) is the name of two train stations in Japan:

 Tomiura Station (Chiba)
 Tomiura Station (Hokkaidō)